Simon Ludders is an English film and television actor, writer and director. He is best known for starring as Renfield in Young Dracula, a CBBC television series that initially aired in 2006 and finalised in 2014.

He also played Trevor Smith in Broadchurch and appeared as Mr Swan in TV mini-series Becoming Human.

Next to appearing in film and television, Ludders is a theatre actor. In October 2014, he played Banquo in Macbeth, by William Shakespeare at the Colchester Mercury.

Ludders had most recently appeared in the fifth series of The Dumping Ground, the spin-off of the successful Tracy Beaker franchise as Peter Umbleby, a snobby next door neighbour living next to the care home, with a strong grudge against living next to a children's home, and later in the series finale, trying to get the care home closed and knocked down.

Filmography

As an actor

Film

Television

As a writer, director and producer

Theatre

External links

References

English male television actors
English male film actors
English screenwriters
English male screenwriters
Living people
20th-century English male actors
21st-century English male actors
Year of birth missing (living people)